The Demta–Sentani languages form a language family of coastal Indonesian Papua near the Papua New Guinea border.

Languages
Demta–Sentani
Demta
Sentani proper
Sentani
Nafri
Tabla (Tanah Merah)

The term 'Sentani' is ambiguous. It may be used in a wider sense, including Demta, in a narrow sense (Sentani proper) excluding Demta – either as an unrelated language family or as a branch of Demta–Sentani – or for the Sentani language itself. Usher distinguishes these three scopes as 'Demta – Sentani Lake', 'Sentani Lake' and 'Sentani'.

Classification
Demta–Sentani was a branch of Stephen Wurm's proposal for Trans–New Guinea.  The languages have lexical similarities with the Asmat–Kamoro languages, though later linguists have not accepted the resemblances as indicative of a genealogical relationship. Pawley and Hammarström (2018) list the following resemblances between the Sentani languages and proto-Trans-New Guinea, though they classify Sentani as a separate language family rather than as part of Trans-New Guinea.

C. Sentani an- ‘eat’ < *na-
C. Sentani mikæ ‘vomit’ (n.) < *mVkV[C]
C. Sentani mu ‘penis’ < *mo
W. Sentani, Tabla oto ‘leg’ < *k(a,o)ndok
Tabla miŋ, C. Sentani mi ‘louse’ < *iman
C. Sentani mi- ‘come’ < *me-

Ross (2005) does not believe these demonstrate a genealogical relationship, and proposes instead that the Demta–Sentani languages are related to the East Bird's Head languages, in a tentative East Bird's Head – Sentani family. 
Foley (2018) classifies them as an independent language family.
Usher (2020) tentatively includes them in a proposed Northwest Papuan family, though as of 2020 it's not clear whether the resemblances are due to inheritance or borrowing.

The connection between Demta and the Sentani languages is not supported by Søren Wichmann (2013)'s automated comparison.

Pronouns
The pronouns Ross reconstructs for proto-family are:

{| class=wikitable
|-
| rowspan=2| I || rowspan=2| *də || exclusive we || *me
|-
| inclusive we || *e
|-
| thou || *wa || you || ?
|-
| s/he || *nə || they || ?
|}

Comparative pronouns in Sentani languages:
{| class="wikitable"
! pronoun !! Sentani !! Tabla !! Nafri !! Sowari
|-
! 1s
| də(yæ) || də || te(ye) || mini
|-
! 2s
| wə(yæ) || wə || we(ye) || we
|-
! 3s
| nə(yæ) || nə || ne(ye) || ngane
|-
! 1p.excl
| me(yæ) || e || me || ngama
|-
! 1p.incl
| e(yæ) ||  ||  || 
|-
! 2p
| mə(yæ) || we || mai || me
|-
! 3p
| nə(yæ) || nə || ne(ye) || kumbi
|}

Vocabulary comparison
The following basic vocabulary words are from McElhanon & Voorhoeve (1970) (for Sentani) and Voorhoeve (1975), as cited in the Trans-New Guinea database:

{| class="wikitable sortable"
! gloss !! Sowari !! Nafri !! Sentani
|-
! head
| tuniyiŋgan || yebu || faləm
|-
! hair
| pioupiə || mwa || uma
|-
! eye
| kariŋgewa || iro || i joko
|-
! nose
|  ||  || face
|-
! tooth
| itini || cə || itəha
|-
! leg
| nəmbia || oto || oro
|-
! louse
| ami ||  || mi
|-
! dog
| aweŋgen || yoku || yoku
|-
! pig
| nifie || obo || obo
|-
! bird
| ey || au || aye
|-
! egg
| kuku || to || do
|-
! blood
| owar || sa || oki
|-
! bone
| ari || iro || po
|-
! skin
| yow yim || wa || wa
|-
! breast
|  ||  || nimə
|-
! tree
| ya-yeŋgan || ono || no
|-
! man
| watuga || to || do
|-
! sun
| omar || sipo || hu
|-
! water
| yarim ||  || bu
|-
! fire
| payn || i || i
|-
! stone
| kara || tuka || duka
|-
! name
| aror || to || do
|-
! eat
| emaŋo || anforu || anəi-ko
|-
! one
| upu || mbe || əmbai
|-
! two
| pugwai || be || be
|}

See also
Papuan languages
Districts of Papua for a list of districts and villages with respective languages

References

 
Languages of Indonesia
Northwest Papuan languages
Western New Guinea
Language families